The  Asian Men's Volleyball Championship was the eight staging of the Asian Men's Volleyball Championship, a biennial international volleyball tournament organised by the Asian Volleyball Confederation (AVC) with Korea Volleyball Association (KVA). The tournament was held in Seoul, South Korea from 11 to 23 September 1995.

Preliminary round

Pool A

|}

Pool B

|}

Pool C

|}

Pool D

|}

Quarter-finals
 The results and the points of the matches between the same teams that were already played during the preliminary round shall be taken into account for the Quarter-finals.

Pool E

|}

|}

Pool F

|}

|}

Final round
 The results and the points of the matches between the same teams that were already played during the previous rounds shall be taken into account for the final round.

Classification 5th–8th

|}

Championship

|}

|}

Final standing

References
Results

A
V
V
Asian men's volleyball championships